Captain Lisa Jade Head (30 November 1981 – 19 April 2011) was a British Army officer.   She was the first female bomb disposal officer to be killed on operations. She died on 19 April 2011 at the age of 29, having sustained serious injuries on active service in Afghanistan.  At the time of her death, Head was the first female officer and the second British servicewoman to die in Afghanistan since 2001, after Sarah Bryant, and the 364th member of the British armed forces in total.

Life
Born in Huddersfield, West Yorkshire, Head attended Greenhead College and studied human biology at the University of Huddersfield before attending the Royal Military Academy at Sandhurst. She served in Iraq and Afghanistan as an air transport liaison officer with the Royal Logistic Corps before being transferred to 321 Explosive Ordnance Disposal (EOD) Squadron, 11 Explosive Ordnance Department, Royal Logistic Corps, with whom she served in Northern Ireland.  She was deployed to Afghanistan on 27 March 2011. She was a bomb disposal specialist and had achieved the "High Threat IED Operators" status indicating great expertise.

Death
She was mortally injured in Nahr-e-Saraj in Helmand Province on 18 April 2011, 22 days after arriving in Afghanistan for the second time, while attempting to disable a cluster of improvised explosive devices, which defence sources said had been placed to catch out a bomb disposal expert.  She disabled one device, but was hit when a second device in the chain went off.  She lost nearly all her limbs in the explosion.  She was evacuated by helicopter to Camp Bastion in Lashkar Gah, from where she was flown back to Queen Elizabeth hospital in Birmingham.  She died there the following day.

Funeral
Head's funeral was held on 6 May 2011 at Huddersfield Parish Church. A guard of honour from her regiment lined the steps of the church at the funeral procession and carried her coffin into the church. More than 1,000 people attended the funeral, including family, friends, military personnel and residents of Huddersfield.

See also
Sarah Bryant, the first British servicewoman killed in Afghanistan

References

2011 deaths
Royal Logistic Corps officers
Women in the British Army
British Army personnel of the War in Afghanistan (2001–2021)
Women in 21st-century warfare
People from Huddersfield
Alumni of the University of Huddersfield
British military personnel killed in the War in Afghanistan (2001–2021)
Graduates of the Royal Military Academy Sandhurst
1981 births
Bomb disposal personnel
Deaths by improvised explosive device in Afghanistan
Military personnel from Yorkshire